Cold Storage is a Singaporean multinational supermarket company currently owned by DFI Retail Group. Its parent company also operates Market Place stores, now branded as Cold Storage Fresh, as well as the Giant hypermarket brand, and has various other supermarkets around Asia including Hero and Wellcome.

Founded in 1903 as the Singapore Cold Storage Company, Cold Storage was one of the first supermarkets in Singapore to offer its merchandise online in 1997. The number of regular customers has since grown from 6,000 in 1998, to more than 15,000 in 2012. In 1992, DFI purchased the company.

SGS has awarded a HACCP certification to Cold Storage, for its quality and integrity in food safety. As of 2022, Cold Storage operates 50 stores in Singapore, located across the country in city centre, affluent suburbs and HDB (public housing) estates.

History

Early years
Established in 1903 in Singapore, Cold Storage started as a small depot storing and selling mainly frozen meat. Cold Storage was then known as the Singapore Cold Storage Company, and was the main manufacturer of ice in Singapore. Taking advantage of the booming ice manufacturing and refrigeration business, Cold Storage ventured into the ice cream business. In 1923, a small factory was set up at the Borneo Wharf of the Harbourfront district to manufacture ice cream under the Paradise brand.
 
In its early days, the company's primary concern was to have a quick and profitable turnover of its imported meats and range of products. Cold Storage later shifted from counter-service to self-service, introducing the supermarket to Singapore.

Tropical dairy farm
In 1937, Cold Storage founded the world's first tropical dairy farm at the Bukit Timah district of Singapore, which aimed to produce fresh pasteurised milk. This farm, then known as the Singapore Dairy Farm, was situated inside what is now the Bukit Timah Nature Reserve. It kept as many as 800 cows. Pasteurised milk produced at the farm was packaged in pyramid-shaped cartons and sold under the brand Magnolia.

Cold Storage is the Singapore's oldest established supermarket operator. It was the first supermarket in Singapore to receive the CaseTrust mark introduced by the Consumer Association of Singapore (CASE) in 1998 which identifies companies that receive a high degree of consumer confidence. It was also the first supermarket in Singapore to receive MUIS certification for its supermarket operations at Causeway Point in Woodlands, thus providing Muslims with the assurance of Halal purchases.

Recent years
In 1992, DFI Retail Group purchased the company, although no major changes were made to the Cold Storage brand.

Cold Storage started the Fresh Food Distribution Centre in Singapore in 1999, a composite multi-temperature warehousing for fresh and frozen food distribution.

Brands

Private labels 
Cold Storage supermarkets sell products from DFI's Meadows and Yu Pin King private labels.

Cold Storage Fresh and Mercató

Cold Storage Fresh (formerly Market Place, Jasons and Jasons Deli) in Singapore, Mercató was formerly known as Jasons Food Hall and had started business in 1975. Now, It operates five stores in Singapore.

Giant

Giant, a subsidiary of Cold Storage, is one of the largest players of the retail industry in Singapore as well as in Malaysia, having over 85 branches spread throughout the country. It was founded by the Teng family in 1944. Prices at Giant are significantly cheaper than at Cold Storage.

Shop N Save
Dairy Farm Singapore acquired Shop N Save in 2003, 35 stores from QAF and Belgian retailer, Delhaize.

It was a former discount supermarket chain in Singapore, operating 50 stores located across the island in HDB estates and suburban malls. It sells a range of cheap products and fresh food. In 2013, it was merged with Giant.

Notes and references

External links
 Official Website

1903 establishments in Singapore
Supermarkets of Singapore
Retail companies established in 1903
Singaporean brands